For the Love of the Game may refer to:

For Love of the Game (film) with Kevin Costner
For Love of the Game novel by Pulitzer Prize-winning author Michael Shaara, published posthumously in 1991
For the Love of the Game (album) album by Christian metal group Pillar  2008